Épiez Aerodrome was a temporary World War I airfield in France.  It was located  West of Épiez-sur-Meuse, in the Meuse department in Lorraine in north-eastern France.

Overview
Epiez was built for the United States First Army Air Service in early spring 1918, and used by Aero Squadron training with the Pursuit Organization and Training Center, before joining the 1st Pursuit Group at the Croix de Metz Aerodrome, the last gone by 1 June 1918:

 27th Aero Squadron (Pursuit, training) 24 April – 1 June 1918
 94th Aero Squadron (Pursuit, training) 1–7 April 1918
 95th Aero Squadron (Pursuit, training) 1 April – 4 May 1918
 147th Aero Squadron (Pursuit, training) 22 April – 1 June 1918

104th Aero Squadron (V Corps Observation Group/First Army) then stopped here 4–8 August 1918, before the airfield was transferred to the French "Aéronautique Militaire" whose "Groupe de Bombardement no 2" was stationed at Epiez from 8 August 1918 until Summer 1919.

Today, it is a series of cultivated fields located on the north side of the Départmental 193 (D193), about one mile west of Épiez, with no indications of its wartime use.

See also

 List of Air Service American Expeditionary Force aerodromes in France

References

 Series "D", Volume 2, Squadron histories,. Gorrell's History of the American Expeditionary Forces Air Service, 1917–1919, National Archives, Washington, D.C.

External links

World War I sites of the United States
World War I airfields in France